Lillies and Remains is a Japanese new wave/post-punk band. The band was formed in 2006, began performing together in 2007 and had its major debut in 2008.

Personnel

Current members
Kent – lead vocals, guitar
Kazuya – guitar

Past members
Minoru Nara – bass guitar (left the band on June 25, 2014)

Discography

Albums
Part of Grace (2009)
TRANSPERSONAL (2011)
Romanticism (2014)

Mini-albums
Moralist S.S. (2008)
MERU (2010)
LOST (2014)

Live albums
London Recordings (2010)

Cover albums
Re/composition (2012)

Compilation albums
UNDERRATED (2012)

Singles
"Wreckage" (2009)
"I Survive" (2013)
"before the end" (2022)

References

2006 establishments in Japan
Japanese new wave musical groups
Japanese post-punk music groups
Musical groups established in 2006
Musical groups from Kyoto Prefecture